Neeley is a surname. Notable people with the surname include:

Clifton Neeley, also known as Clifton McNeely, (1919–2003), American basketball player and coach
Cynthia Neeley, American politician in Michigan
George A. Neeley (1879–1919), U.S. Representative from Kansas
J. Neeley Johnson, also known as J. Neely Johnson, (1825–1872), American lawyer and politician
Kyle Neeley of Sponge (band), an Alternative Rock band from Detroit, Michigan
Melissa Neeley (born 1972), News Director at Monticello Media
Paul Neeley Brown (born 1926), United States federal judge
Sheldon Neeley (born 1968), American politician in Michigan
Ted Neeley (born 1943), rock and roll drummer, singer, actor, composer, and record producer

See also
Neeley, Idaho, unincorporated community in Power County, Idaho, United States
Neeley Entrepreneurship Center, also known as Texas Christian University
Neeley School of Business, the undergraduate and graduate business school at Texas Christian University (TCU)
16268 Mcneeley, main-belt asteroid discovered on May 7, 2000
Neely
Nealy
Neelly